is a Japanese racing driver, currently racing in the Super GT Series and the Super Formula Championship for Toyota Gazoo Racing and ROOKIE Racing.

Oshima is one of only two drivers that have won championships in both classes of Super GT: He won the GT300 Drivers' Championship in 2007, and the GT500 Drivers' Championship in 2019. He also won the 2007 All-Japan Formula 3 Championship and the 2009 Suzuka Summer Endurance race. Outside of Japan, Oshima finished third in the 2007 Macau Grand Prix Formula 3 race, and competed in the 2008 Formula 3 Euro Series as a member of the Toyota Young Driver Program (TDP). Oshima is a five-time class winner at the Nürburgring 24 Hours (2010, 2012, 2014, 2015, 2016) as a member of Gazoo Racing/Toyota Gazoo Racing.

Racing record

Career summary

Complete Super GT results

Complete Formula Nippon/Super Formula results

* Season still in progress.

References

External links
 
 Career statistics from Driver Database

1987 births
Living people
Japanese racing drivers
Formula Nippon drivers
Japanese Formula 3 Championship drivers
Formula 3 Euro Series drivers
Asian Formula Renault Challenge drivers
Super GT drivers
People from Gunma Prefecture
Super Formula drivers
Manor Motorsport drivers
Nürburgring 24 Hours drivers
Toyota Gazoo Racing drivers
Team LeMans drivers
TOM'S drivers
Asia Racing Team drivers